The Gold Cup is a greyhound racing competition held annually at Shelbourne Park in Dublin.

Venues & Distances 
1998–2010 (Shelbourne Park, 525y)	
2011–2012 (Shelbourne Park, 550y)
2013–present (Shelbourne Park, 525y)

Past winners

Race Sponsors
1998–2011 (Tote)
2012–2013 (Satellite Information Services (SIS))
2014–2015 (Tote)
2016–2021 (Best Car Parks)
2022–2022 (Rásaíocht Con Éireann Traceability System)
2023–2023 (Paddy Kehoe Suspended Ceilings)

References

Greyhound racing competitions in Dublin (city)
Recurring sporting events established in 1998